Veracruz is a state in Mexico. Veracruz or Vera Cruz (literally "True Cross") may also refer to:

People
 María González Veracruz (born 1979), Spanish politician
 Philip Vera Cruz (1904–1994), Filipino American labor leader
 Tomé Vera Cruz (born 1955?), São Tomé and Príncipe politician
 Vera Cruz, a fictional transsexual character in Pedro Almodóvar's 2011 Spanish-language film The Skin I Live In

Places
 Brazil:
 Ilha de Vera Cruz, the name originally given to Brazil by its first Portuguese colonizers
 Vera Cruz, Bahia
 Vera Cruz, Rio Grande do Sul
 Vera Cruz, São Paulo

 East Timor: 
 Vera Cruz (East Timor), a subdistrict of Dili District

 Honduras:
 Veracruz, Copán

Mexico: 
 Veracruz, a state in Mexico
Veracruz (city), largest city in the state of Veracruz (formerly spelled "Vera Cruz")
 Attack on Veracruz, 1683
 United States occupation of Veracruz 1914
 Veracruz, Durango, city in the state of Durango

Panama:
Veracruz, Panama

Portugal:
 Vera Cruz, Aveiro, former-civil parish, incorporated into Glória e Vera Cruz

Spain:
 Veracruz, Huesca

United States: 
 Vera Cruz, Indiana
 Vera Cruz, Missouri
 Vera Cruz, Ohio
 Vera Cruz, Pennsylvania

Other

 Glória e Vera Cruz, civil parish in the municipality of Aveiro
 C.D. Veracruz, defunct Mexican football club
 VeraCruz (computer virus), alternative name for the extinct Ping-Pong virus
 Vera Cruz (film), 1954 motion picture starring Gary Cooper and Burt Lancaster
 Vera Cruz (album), 2021 release by Edu Falaschi
 "Veracruz" (song), State Anthem of Veracruz (Himno Estatal de Veracruz)
 "Veracruz" (song), from Warren Zevon's 1978 album Excitable Boy
 Veracruz Canyon, deep-sea canyon in the Gulf of Mexico.
 Hyundai Veracruz,  mid-size 5-door SUV
 Vera Cruz Futebol Clube, Brazilian football club
 Classic Veracruz culture (c. 100 to 1000 CE), a cultural area of the present-day Mexican state of Veracruz
 "Vera Cruz"(song), by Márcio Borges and Milton Nascimento

See also
 Battle of Veracruz (disambiguation)